Wom or Wam is a Papuan language of the Torricelli language family spoken by 4,264 people in East Sepik province, Papua New Guinea.

External links 
 Paradisec has two collections with materials from Wom, one from Arthur Capell (AC1) and the other from Don Laycock (DL2)

References

Torricelli languages
Languages of East Sepik Province